In biochemistry and pharmacology, the Hill equation refers to two closely related equations that reflect the binding of ligands to macromolecules, as a function of the ligand concentration. A ligand is "a substance that forms a complex with a biomolecule to serve a biological purpose" (ligand definition), and a macromolecule is a very large molecule, such as a protein, with a complex structure of components (macromolecule definition).  Protein-ligand binding typically changes the structure of the target protein, thereby changing its function in a cell.

The distinction between the two Hill equations is whether they measure occupancy or response. The Hill–Langmuir equation reflects the occupancy of macromolecules: the fraction that is saturated or bound by the ligand. This equation is formally equivalent to the Langmuir isotherm. Conversely, the Hill equation proper reflects the cellular or tissue response to the ligand: the physiological output of the system, such as muscle contraction.

The Hill–Langmuir equation was originally formulated by Archibald Hill in 1910 to describe the sigmoidal O2 binding curve of haemoglobin.

The binding of a ligand to a macromolecule is often enhanced if there are already other ligands present on the same macromolecule (this is known as cooperative binding). The Hill–Langmuir equation is useful for determining the degree of cooperativity of the ligand(s) binding to the enzyme or receptor. The Hill coefficient provides a way to quantify the degree of interaction between ligand binding sites.

The Hill equation (for response) is important in the construction of dose-response curves.

Proportion of ligand-bound receptors 

The Hill–Langmuir equation is a special case of a rectangular hyperbola and is commonly expressed in the following ways.

,
where:
 is the fraction of the receptor protein concentration that is bound by the ligand,
[L]is the total ligand concentration,
 is the apparent dissociation constant derived from the law of mass action,
is the ligand concentration producing half occupation,
 is the Hill coefficient.

The special case where  is a Monod equation.

Constants 
Kd is the equilibrium constant for dissociation.  is defined so that , this is also known as the microscopic dissociation constant and is the ligand concentration occupying half of the binding sites.

Gaddum equation 
The Gaddum equation is a further generalisation of the Hill-equation, incorporating the presence of a reversible competitive antagonist. The Gaddum equation is derived similarly to the Hill-equation but with 2 equilibria: both the ligand with the receptor and the antagonist with the receptor. Hence, the Gaddum equation has 2 constants: the equilibrium constants of the ligand and that of the antagonist

Hill plot 

The Hill plot is the rearrangement of the Hill–Langmuir Equation into a straight line.

Taking the reciprocal of both sides of the Hill–Langmuir equation, rearranging, and inverting again yields: . Taking the logarithm of both sides of the equation leads to an alternative formulation of the Hill-Langmuir equation:
.

This last form of the Hill–Langmuir equation is advantageous because a plot of  versus  yields a linear plot, which is called a Hill plot. A slope greater than one thus indicates positively cooperative binding between the receptor and the ligand, while a slope less than one indicates negatively cooperative binding.

Transformations of equations into linear forms such as this were very useful before the widespread use of computers, as they allowed researchers to determine parameters by fitting lines to data. However, these transformations affect error propagation, and this may result in undue weight to error in data points near 0 or 1. This impacts the parameters of linear regression lines fitted to the data. Furthermore, the use of computers enables more robust analysis involving nonlinear regression.

Tissue response 

A distinction should be made between quantification of drugs binding to receptors and drugs producing responses. There may not necessarily be a linear relationship between the two values. In contrast to this article's previous definition of the Hill-Langmuir equation, the IUPHAR defines the Hill equation in terms of the tissue response , as

Dissociation constants (in the previous section) relate to ligand binding, while  reflects tissue response.

This form of the equation can reflect tissue/cell/population responses to drugs and can be used to generate dose response curves.

The Del-Castillo Katz model is used to relate the Hill–Langmuir equation to receptor activation by including a second equilibrium of the ligand-bound receptor to an activated form of the ligand-bound receptor.

Statistical analysis of response as a function of stimulus may be performed by regression methods such as the probit model or logit model, or other methods such as the Spearman–Kärber method. Empirical models based on nonlinear regression are usually preferred over the use of some transformation of the data that linearizes the dose-response relationship.

Hill coefficient 
The Hill coefficient is a measure of ultrasensitivity (i.e. how steep is the response curve).

When appropriate, the value of the Hill coefficient describes the cooperativity of ligand binding in the following way:

. Positively cooperative binding: Once one ligand molecule is bound to the enzyme, its affinity for other ligand molecules increases. For example, the Hill coefficient of oxygen binding to haemoglobin (an example of positive cooperativity) falls within the range of 1.7–3.2.
. Negatively cooperative binding: Once one ligand molecule is bound to the enzyme, its affinity for other ligand molecules decreases.
. Noncooperative (completely independent) binding: The affinity of the enzyme for a ligand molecule is not dependent on whether or not other ligand molecules are already bound.

The Hill coefficient can be calculated in terms of potency  as:

.

where EC90 and EC10 are the input values needed to produce the 10% and 90% of the maximal response, respectively.

Derivation from mass action kinetics 
The Hill-Langmuir equation is derived similarly to the Michaelis Menten equation but incorporates the Hill coefficient. Consider a protein (P), such as haemoglobin or a protein receptor, with  binding sites for ligands (L). The binding of the ligands to the protein can be represented by the chemical equilibrium expression:

 {P} + \mathit{n}{L} <=>[k_a][k_d] {P}{L}_\mathit{n},

From the law of mass action, which in turn may be derived from the principles of collision theory, the apparent dissociation constant , an equilibrium constant, is given by:

At the same time, the ratio of the concentration of occupied receptor to total receptor concentration, is given by:

which is a common formulation of the Hill equation.

Consequently, the Hill–Langmuir Equation is also commonly written as an expression for the concentration of bound protein:

 
All of these formulations assume that the protein has  sites to which ligands can bind. In practice, however, the Hill Coefficient  rarely provides an accurate approximation of the number of ligand binding sites on a protein. Consequently, it has been observed that the Hill coefficient should instead be interpreted as an "interaction coefficient" describing the cooperativity among ligand binding sites.

Applications 

The Hill and Hill–Langmuir equations are used extensively in pharmacology to quantify the functional parameters of a drug and are also used in other areas of biochemistry.

The Hill equation can be used to describe dose-response relationships, for example ion channel open-probability (P-open) vs. ligand concentration.

Regulation of gene transcription 
The Hill–Langmuir equation can be applied in modelling the rate at which a gene product is produced when its parent gene is being regulated by transcription factors (e.g., activators and/or repressors). Doing so is appropriate when a gene is regulated by multiple binding sites for transcription factors, in which case the transcription factors may bind the DNA in a cooperative fashion.

If the production of protein from gene  is up-regulated (activated) by a transcription factor , then the rate of production of protein  can be modeled as a differential equation in terms of the concentration of activated  protein:

,

where  is the maximal transcription rate of gene .

Likewise, if the production of protein from gene  is down-regulated (repressed) by a transcription factor , then the rate of production of protein  can be modeled as a differential equation in terms of the concentration of activated  protein:

,
where  is the maximal transcription rate of gene .

Limitations
Because of its assumption that ligand molecules bind to a receptor simultaneously, the Hill–Langmuir equation has been criticized as a physically unrealistic model. Moreover, the Hill coefficient should not be considered a reliable approximation of the number of cooperative ligand binding sites on a receptor except when the binding of the first and subsequent ligands results in extreme positive cooperativity.

Unlike more complex models, the relatively simple Hill–Langmuir equation provides little insight into underlying physiological mechanisms of protein-ligand interactions. This simplicity, however, is what makes the Hill–Langmuir equation a useful empirical model, since its use requires little a priori knowledge about the properties of either the protein or ligand being studied. Nevertheless, other, more complex models of cooperative binding have been proposed. For more information and examples of such models, see Cooperative binding.

Global sensitivity measure such as Hill coefficient do not characterise the local behaviours of the s-shaped curves. Instead, these features are well captured by the response coefficient measure.

There is a link between Hill Coefficient and Response coefficient, as follows. Altszyler et al. (2017) have shown that these ultrasensitivity measures can be linked.

See also

 Binding coefficient 
 Bjerrum plot
 Cooperative binding
 Gompertz curve
 Langmuir adsorption model
 Logistic function
 Michaelis–Menten kinetics
 Monod equation

Notes

References

Further reading
 Dorland's Illustrated Medical Dictionary

External links
 Hill equation calculator

Enzyme kinetics
Pharmacology